Rodenkirchen is a southern borough (Stadtbezirk) of Cologne (Köln) in Germany. The borough includes the quarters Bayenthal, Godorf, Hahnwald, Immendorf, Marienburg, Meschenich, Raderberg, Raderthal, Rodenkirchen, Sürth, Rondorf, Weiß and Zollstock.

The 1000-year-old quarter Rodenkirchen, situated close to the Rhine, today represents the center of the borough. It has more than 16,000 inhabitants.

Subdivisions
Rodenkirchen is made up of 13 Stadtteile (city parts):

Points of interest

 Cologne Rodenkirchen Bridge
 Maternus-Shrine
 Villa Malta
 Alt St. Maternus
 Forstbotanischer Garten Köln, an arboretum and woodland botanical garden

St. Maternus
St. Maternus was built according to the plans of Vinvenz Statz from 1863 to 1867 at the former place of the Carthusian.

St. Maternus was built as a gothic church with only a few ornamentations. It has a tympanum with St. Maternus standing between two angels in front of a panorama of Cologne. Inside the church there is a madonna from Alt St. Maternus (English: Old St. Maternus), the former St. Maternus from 1470.

Restaurant-ship "Alte Liebe"
The ship named "Alte Liebe" (English: Old Love) is a landmark well-known beyond the town of Rodenkirchen. Originally constructed in 1947, it burned down and was restored three times. Today it is used as a restaurant and for events such as weddings.

Transport

Gustav-Heinemann-Ufer connects Rodenkirchen with the Cologne Ring, Bundesautobahn 555 connects Rodenkirchen with the Cologne Beltway.

Rhine bridges
  Südbrücke
  Rodenkirchener Autobahnbrücke

Public transport

Rodenkirchen is served by the Cologne Stadtbahn at Rodenkirchen, connected to the city centres of Cologne and Bonn by lines 16 and 17.

Twin towns – sister cities

Rodenkirchen is "twinned" with the following cities:
  Benfleet, United Kingdom
  Eygelshoven, The Netherlands

References

External links

 Rodenkirchen.de
 Official webpage of the district 

 
Boroughs and quarters of Cologne